Diplock Glacier is a narrow straight glacier,  long, flowing eastward from Detroit Plateau, on Trinity Peninsula in Graham Land, into Prince Gustav Channel  south of Alectoria Island. It is situated south of Marla Glacier and north of Zavera Snowfield. The feature was mapped from surveys by the Falkland Islands Dependencies Survey (1960–61), and was named by the UK Antarctic Place-Names Committee for Bramah Joseph Diplock, a British engineer who made considerable advances in the design of chain-track tractors (1885–1913).

See also
 List of glaciers in the Antarctic
 Glaciology

References

External links
 SCAR Composite Antarctic Gazetteer.

Glaciers of Trinity Peninsula